WVLR (channel 48) is a religious television station licensed to Tazewell, Tennessee, United States, serving the Knoxville area as an owned-and-operated station of the Christian Television Network (CTN). The station's studios are located on Kyker Ferry Road in Kodak, and its transmitter is located on Clinch Mountain near Powder Springs in unincorporated Grainger County.

History

The station signed on October 6, 2002.

Technical information

Subchannels
The station's digital signal is multiplexed:

Analog-to-digital conversion
WVLR shut down its analog signal, over UHF channel 48, on June 12, 2009, the official date in which full-power television stations in the United States transitioned from analog to digital broadcasts under federal mandate. The station "flash-cut" its digital signal into operation on UHF channel 48. Because it was granted an original construction permit after the FCC finalized the DTV allotment plan on April 21, 1997, WVLR did not receive a companion channel for a digital television station.

References

External links 
Official website

Television channels and stations established in 2002
VLR
2002 establishments in Tennessee
Christian Television Network affiliates
Claiborne County, Tennessee